Sinan Özen (b. 1 March 1964, Çayeli, Rize) is a Turkish singer, composer and actor.

Life and career 
Sinan Özen was born on March 1, 1964, in the Çayeli district of Rize. His family moved to İzmit when he was young and he spent a few years of his childhood there. Then they moved to Istanbul where Sinan had his primary and secondary education. He attended high school in Rize, at the Department of Lathe-Leveling in Rize Vocational High School.
Sinan Özen had great passion to music from his young age and his first attempt to get into music world was in 1981 with a song contest that was advertised in a local newspaper. He participated and won the contest, however it did not move him forward in his career.
Later he met Süheyla Altmışdört, a tutor in Academy of Music, with the help of his musician friend, who taught him instrumental and solfeggio classes. He also had instrumental oud and solfeggio training from Irfan Ozbakir, Turkish composer. Encouraged by his tutors he applied to Istanbul Academy of Music, and was accepted to Department of Turkish Classical Music in 1982 from where he graduated in 1988.
His professional career began with his first album Ruyalarim olmasa (“If I have no dreams”) in 1989.
From 1989 to 2016, Sinan Özen produced 17 albums including one Turkish classical music album and 2 singles.

Discography

Singles 
 2016 Sana Birşey Olmasın
 2015 Sevişmeliyiz (We Should Make love)
 2013 Yıkılır İstanbul (Istanbul Will Fall)

Albums 
 2014 Babamın Şarkıları ve İnce Saz (My Father's Songs and Fine Saz)
 2011 Usta (Master)
 2010 Sinan Özen 2010
 2007 Ödün Vermem (I Cannot Give Over)
 2006 Aşkın S Hali (S State of Love)
 2004 Islak Islak (Wet)
 2003 Quiero Comer Tus Labios & Senin Agzini Yerim Ben (I Wanna Eat Your Lips)
 2002 Serseri Gönlüm (My Crazy Heart)
 2000 Gitsem Uzaklara (If I Could Go Far Away)
 1998 Tek Başına (Alone)
 1997 Evlere Şenlik (Goodness Me)
 1996 Sigaramın Dumanı Sen (Be My Cigarette Smoke)
 1994 Kapına Gül Bıraktım (I Left a Rose at Your Doorsteps)
 1993 Ölürüm Yoluna (I Would Die For You)
 1992 Öpsene Beni (Kiss Me)
 1991 Aşık Olmak İstiyorum (Wanna Fall in Love)
 1990 Kar Tanesi (Snowflake)
 1989 Rüyalarım Olmasa (If I Have No Dreams)

EPs 
 2011 Ben Seni Sevdim ft Asli Gungor (I Fell in Love with You)
 2003 Senin Ağzını Yerim (I Wanna Eat Your Lips)
 1998 Çaresizim (Desperate)
 1998 Tek Başına (Alone)
 1997 Evlere Şenlik (Goodness Me)
 1996 Sigaramın Dumanı (My Cigarette Smoke)
 1994 Kapına Kırmızı Bir Gül Bıraktım (I Left a Red Rose at Your Doorsteps)
 1993 Ölürüm Yoluna (I Would Die For You)
 1992 Öpsene Beni (Kiss Me)
 1991 Dertli Ud (Weeping Oud)
 1990 Kar Tanesi (Snowflake)
 1989 Rüyalarım Olmasa (If I Have No Dreams)

Music videos 
 Radyoda Bir İnce Saz (Fine Saz on Radio)
 Yıkılır İstanbul (Istanbul Will Fall)
 Ben Seni Sevdim (I Fell in Love with You)
 Teessüf Ederim (I Feel Sorry)
 Yaşamak (To Live)
 Çok Ama Çok (So Much)
 Bişey Olmaz Deme (Don't Tell Nothing Gonna Happen)
 Bilemiyorum (Don't Know)
 Sana Kıyamam (Unable To Be Heartless To You)
 Seni Düşünüyorum (Thinking About You)
 Canım Yandı (I Got Hurt)
 Ödün Vermem (I Cannot Give Over)
 Seni Öyle Çok (Love You So Much)
 Koptuğu Yerde Bırak (Leave It)
 Ellerini Bırak (Leave Your Hands)
 Sildim (I Have Crossed You)
 Islak Islak (Wet)
 Kulağımdan Öp Beni (Kiss My Ears)
 Yatiya Geldim (Came To Stay Overnight)
 Uyusun Da Büyüsün (Sleep and Grow)
 Gülüm (My Rose)
 Ezanlar Bizim İçin (Azans are For Us)
 Hazalım (My Fallen Leaf)
 Çaresizim (Desperate)
 Ağlayamadım (I Couldn't Cry)
 Sigaramın Dumanı Sen (Be My Cigarette Smoke)
 Vicdansızlar (Unscrupulous)
 Başımın Tatlı Belası (My Sweet Curse)
 Evlere Şenlik (Goodness Me)
 Senin Ağzını Yerim (I Wanna Eat Your Lips)

Filmography 
Gecenin Işıltısı (Sparkle of the Night)
Arka Sokaklar 2. Sezon (Back Streets 2. Season)
Tirvana
Kurasların Efendisi (The Lord of the Cuirass)
Sinan Özen Söylüyor (Sinan Ozen Sings)

References

External links 
 Official website
1964 births
Living people
Turkish music arrangers
Turkish film score composers
People from Çayeli
Turkish television talk show hosts
Turkish oud players
20th-century Turkish male actors
21st-century Turkish male actors 
Bağlama players
Turkish folk musicians
Turkish tambur players
Santur players
Turkish classical composers
Turkish classical musicians
Musicians of Ottoman classical music
Composers of Ottoman classical music
Turkish male songwriters
Turkish folk-pop singers
Darülfünun alumni
Istanbul Technical University alumni
Turkish record producers
Turkish male film actors
Turkish lyricists
Turkish television presenters
Turkish classical kemençe players
Turkish male television actors
20th-century Turkish male musicians
21st-century Turkish male musicians